CRTS may refer to:

The economic concept of Returns to scale
Canadian Reformed Theological Seminary
Catalina Real-time Transient Survey, a sky survey
Certified Relocation and Transition Specialist